Darwin Andrés Echeverry Angulo (born 2 January 1996 in Cali) is a Colombian-born Spanish sprinter specialising in the 400 metres. He represented Spain in the 4 × 400 metres relay at the 2017 World Championships finishing fifth in the final in a new national record of 3:00.65.

His personal bests in the 400 metres are 46.23 seconds outdoors (Getafe 2018) and 46.61 seconds indoors (Salamanca 2017).

International competitions

References

1996 births
Living people
Spanish male sprinters
World Athletics Championships athletes for Spain
Sportspeople from Cali
People from Tenerife
Sportspeople from the Province of Santa Cruz de Tenerife
Colombian emigrants to Spain
Athletes (track and field) at the 2018 Mediterranean Games
European Championships (multi-sport event) bronze medalists
European Athletics Championships medalists
Mediterranean Games silver medalists for Spain
Mediterranean Games medalists in athletics